Karl Peter Thomas Feifar, OAM (5 January 1973 – 29 May 2009) was an indigenous Australian amputee athlete and Paralympic competitor.

Personal
Feifar was born in the Perth suburb of Subiaco in 1973.  His parents were Wendy and Peter. His deformed foot was amputated at birth. His parents encouraged him to play sport. Feifar commented Even as a kid, if I fell down, my mother would tell me to pick myself up and keep going. My parents gave me the positive will to succeed. Despite his below-knee amputation, as a child he played Australian football for Central Club in Jarrahdale, swam and competed in athletics with the aid of a prosthetic leg. He had worked for Australia Post as a driver. He had a partner, Kathleen, and a daughter.

Career
At the 1988 Pan Pacific School Games in Sydney,  Feifar won three gold and one bronze medals. In 1990, he set a world record and four Australian records at the Australian Amputee Games. 

At the 1990 World Championships and Games for the Disabled in Assen Netherlands, he won five gold and two silver medals and broke two world records (long jump and pentathlon). After these Championships, he accepted a scholarship in the newly established Australian Institute of Sport Athletes with a Disabilities program and was coached by Chris Nunn.

At the 1992 Barcelona Games, he won a  gold medal in the Men's 4 × 100 m Relay TS2,4 event and a silver medal in the Men's Long Jump J2 event. In 1993, he retired from competition. His coach Chris Nunn was quoted as saying: "Karl was extremely talented but due to early retirement he didn't realise his full potential".

Death

Feifar died of a heart attack on 29 May 2009. His partner Kathleen could not connect to the 000 emergency number from her Telstra home phone in Orelia, and was forced to use her work mobile phone. There was an appeal to help pay for his burial in the Fremantle Cemetery.

Recognition

Member of the Aboriginal and Islander Sports Hall of Fame.
1990 – Young Aboriginal Athlete of the Year 
1991 – National Sportsman of the Year at the National Aboriginal and Torres Strait Islander Sports Awards.
1992 – Medal of the Order of Australia after his 1992 gold medal.

References

External links
 Karl Feifar – Athletics Australia Results

1973 births
2009 deaths
Paralympic athletes of Australia
Athletes (track and field) at the 1992 Summer Paralympics
Medalists at the 1992 Summer Paralympics
Paralympic gold medalists for Australia
Paralympic silver medalists for Australia
Sprinters with limb difference
Long jumpers with limb difference
Javelin throwers with limb difference
Paralympic sprinters
Paralympic long jumpers
Paralympic javelin throwers
Recipients of the Medal of the Order of Australia
Australian Institute of Sport Paralympic track and field athletes
Australian amputees
Indigenous Australian Paralympians
Sportsmen from Western Australia
Athletes from Perth, Western Australia
Burials at Fremantle Cemetery
Paralympic medalists in athletics (track and field)
Australian male sprinters
Australian male long jumpers
Australian pentathletes
Australian male javelin throwers